Saluria maculivittella is a species of snout moth. It is found in France and on Sardinia, as well as in Tunisia, the Caucasus and Turkey.

The wingspan is about 25 mm.

References

Moths described in 1887
Anerastiini
Moths of Europe
Moths of Asia